Stavros Halkias (born February 11, 1989) is an American stand-up comedian and podcaster. Active since the early 2010s, he is a nationally touring comic who came to prominence as a founding co-host of the podcast Cum Town.

Early life
Halkias was born and raised in Baltimore, Maryland, to Greek immigrant parents (a Macedonian mother and Athenian father) and attended the Baltimore Polytechnic Institute, a public high school where he played football. He attended the University of Maryland, Baltimore County, working for Marc Steiner's Center for Emerging Media as an intern. He stated on the podcast Digression Sessions that he was a few credits short of graduating.

Career
Halkias began performing comedy while attending UMBC at which he hosted a monthly comedy showcase. During this period, he was active in the greater Maryland, Washington, D.C., and Virginia area and, in 2012, was named Baltimore's New Comedian of the Year. 

He later moved to New York City where he has since made numerous radio and podcast guest appearances, and has written and performed on Adult Swim, IFC, MSG Network's People Talking Sports and Other Stuff. He has appeared in the Comedy Central series Comedy Central Stand Up Featuring, Life Fails, and Sex Fails, and has acted in other internet shorts. He has also performed at venues like the New York Comedy Festival and has opened for acts including Wham City, Tom Papa, and Robert Kelly. 

Halkias is best known as a former co-host of the podcast Cum Town from its inception in 2016 until his departure in 2022. Since 2019, he has co-hosted the basketball podcast Pod Don't Lie with Sam Morril. Prior to this podcast, he co-hosted White Chocolate NBA Pipecast with Adam Friedland. He also hosts a Twitch series Stavvy Solves Your Problems. In 2022, Halkias released his first comedy special, Live At The Lodge Room, on his YouTube channel, which reached 2 million views in three weeks.

Halkias has become well-known for his crowd-work, often engaging actively with the audience and riffing on their stories and anecdotes. Many of his stand-up clips on his YouTube channel feature this practice.

Halkias has been noted as a body positive activist. Halkias' involvement with Cum Town podcast has occasionally  caused controversy, with criticism levied at the podcast's association with the dirtbag left.

Works 
Comedy specials

 Live At The Lodge Room (2022)
Podcasts

 Cum Town (2016–2022)
 White Chocolate NBA Pipecast (2017–2018)
 Pod Don't Lie (2019–present) 
 Stavvy's World (2022–present)

References 

1989 births
Living people
American male comedians
American people of Greek descent
American podcasters
American stand-up comedians
Comedians from Maryland
People from Baltimore
21st-century American comedians